At least two warships of Japan have borne the name Isokaze:

 , an Imperial Japanese Navy  launched in 1916 and scrapped in 1935
 , an Imperial Japanese Navy  launched in 1939 and lost in 1945

Japanese Navy ship names
Imperial Japanese Navy ship names